AYA is a Slovak rock band formed in the fall of 1992 in Žilina, Slovakia best known for the hits Malý princ, Baby kakavové, So mnou, Teším sa na teba, Lietaj, dýchaj, buď.... The classic lineup consisted of Boris Lettrich, Mário Tománek, Vlado Kubala, Rado Pažej. Singer of band is the author of majority songs for Tomáš Bezdeda, a finalist in Slovensko hľadá SuperStar, the Slovak version of TV show American Idol.

Members
 Mário Tománek – guitars
 Boris Lettrich – lead vocals
 Vlado Kubala – bass guitar
 Rado Pažej – drums
 Stano Vandlík – keyboards

Discography 
 Baby kakavové – 1992– promo
'Aj ty, AYA?!   – 1994
Jé, jé, jé...  – 1997
Try            – 2000
04-10          – 2003
ale ye nám dobre          – 2007

See also
 The 100 Greatest Slovak Albums of All Time

External links
 

Slovak rock music groups
Lettrich